The Federation of Associations in Behavioral & Brain Sciences (abbreviated FABBS) is a Washington, D.C.-based coalition of learned societies dedicated to psychology and related behavioral sciences. Its official journal is Policy Insights from the Behavioral and Brain Sciences, which is published by SAGE Publications.

The group's stated purpose is to help improve human potential and well-being through supporting mind, brain and behavioral sciences. Functionally, FABBS communicates both to policymakers and the public about basic and applied research in these areas.

History
The Federation of Associations in Behavioral & Brain Sciences was founded in 1981 as the Federation of Behavioral, Psychological, and Cognitive Sciences. Its founding president was George Mandler. In 2004, the organization established the Foundation for the Advancement of Behavioral & Brain Sciences. In 2009, the organization was renamed to its current name, and the Foundation for the Advancement of Behavioral & Brain Sciences was renamed the FABBS Foundation. In 2015, the FABBS Foundation was merged into the Federation of Associations in Behavioral & Brain Sciences.

Members
Member societies of FABBS include: 
Academy of Behavioral Medicine Research
American Educational Research Association
American Psychological Association
American Psychosomatic Society
Association for Applied Psychophysiology and Biofeedback
Association for Behavior Analysis International
Behavior Genetics Association
Cognitive Neuroscience Society 
Cognitive Science Society
International Congress of Infant Studies
International Society for Developmental Psychobiology
Massachusetts Neuropsychological Society
National Academy of Neuropsychology
Psychonomic Society
Society for Behavioral Neuroendocrinology
Society for Computation in Psychology
Society for Judgment and Decision Making
Society for Mathematical Psychology
Society for Psychophysiological Research
Society for Research in Psychopathology
Society for Research in Child Development
Society for Text & Discourse
Society for the Psychological Study of Social Issues
Society for the Scientific Study of Reading
Society of Experimental Social Psychology
Society of Multivariate Experimental Psychology
Vision Sciences Society

Each society that is a member of FABBS pays dues to the organization to support its work.

References

External links

Federations
Organizations based in Washington, D.C.
Organizations established in 1981
Psychology organizations based in the United States